Neurophyseta sittenfelda is a moth in the family Crambidae. It was described by Eugenie Phillips-Rodriguez and Maria Alma Solis in 1996. It is found in Costa Rica.

Etymology
The species is named for Ana Sittenfeld.

References

Moths described in 1996
Musotiminae